The Vukanović dynasty (Vukanovići / Вукановићи), was a medieval Serbian dynasty that ruled over inner Serbia, centered in the Raška region, during the 11th and 12th century. Several members of the Vukanović dynasty also ruled in some other regions (Zachlumia, Travunia, Duklja, and also Croatia). The house may have descended from the Vojislavljević dynasty of Duklja. Vukanović dynasty was later succeeded in Serbia by the closely related Nemanjić dynasty.

The Vukanović family was named by later historians, after its founder Vukan of Serbia. However, the family itself is also known as the Urošević dynasty (Uroševići / Урошевићи), after Vukan's nephew, Uroš I of Serbia.

The rulers of this dynasty were split into two branches: the branch in Raška and the branch in Zachumlia. Rulers of the first branch wore the title Grand Prince of Serbia, while its Zachlumian branch wore the title Duke of Zachlumia. Other titles included Ban of Croatia, held by Beloš of the branch in Raška, Prince of Duklja and Travunia, held by Desa of the same branch, and Count of Split, held by Petar of the Zachlumian branch. Other titles included Duke of Upper Zachlumia, held by Toljen II of the Zachlumian branch, Duke of Southern Zachlumia, held by Andrija of the Zachlumian branch, and Prince of the Littoral, also held by Andrija of the Zachlumian branch.

According to the Chronicle of the Priest of Duklja, Doclean king Constantine Bodin gained inner Serbia (c. 1083-1084) and assigned two princes from his court, brothers Vukan and Marko, to govern the region of Raška. According to Mavro Orbini, Bodin split Raška into two principalities, assigning one of the principalities to Vukan and the other to Marko.

Rulers

Branch in Raška 
 Vukan and Marko (1083 / 84 – c. 1112 - 15)
 Uroš I (c. 1112 - 15 – 1131 / c. 1145)
 Uroš II (c. 1145 – 1155, 1155 - 1161 / 62)
 Beloš (1142–1158, 1163 (Croatia); 1161 / 1162 (Raška))
 Desa (1155, 1161 / 62 – 1165 (Raška); 1148 – 1162 (Duklja))
 Tihomir (1165–1166)
 Stefan Nemanja (1166–1196): (thereafter Nemanjić dynasty)

Branch in Zachlumia 
 Zavida (fl. 1112)
 Miroslav (Prince of Hum in 1166-1190 and 1192-1198)
 Toljen (Knez of Hum in 1192–1198)
 Petar (Prince of Hum in 1198–1216)
  Andrija (Prince of Hum in 1216-1218 and  1250)
 Toljen II (Prince of Hum in 1227–1239)
 Nikola (Prince of Hum in 1239-?)
 Bogdan (Prince of Hum in 1249-1252)
 Radoslav (Prince of Hum in  1254)

See also 

 Chronicle of the Priest of Duklja

References

Sources 
Primary sources

 
 
 
 
 
 

Secondary sources

External links 
 Sokol Grad: Vukanovići
 Srpski vladari: Vukanovići

 
Serbian royal families
11th century in Serbia
12th century in Serbia